The Bank of Webster, located at 704 Main St. in Minden, Louisiana, was built in 1910.  It was listed on the National Register of Historic Places in 1987.

It was deemed notable as "a very superior example from among a limited number of historic commercial buildings in Webster Parish."  It is a two-story brick Classical Revival structure.

References

Bank buildings on the National Register of Historic Places in Louisiana
Neoclassical architecture in Louisiana
Commercial buildings completed in 1910
Webster Parish, Louisiana